Campos dos Goytacazes is a municipality located in the northern region of Rio de Janeiro State, Brazil, with a population of 471,737 inhabitants.

History

Colonization of the area started in the 16th century, and the village of São Salvador de Campos de Goytacazes was founded on May 29, 1677. On March 28, 1835, the village was promoted to city status.

The Roman Catholic Diocese of Campos was the see of Bishop Antônio de Castro Mayer, nicknamed "The Lion of Campos", who was one of the bishops who opposed the Vatican II reforms and who teamed with Archbishop Marcel Lefebvre of Dakar to consecrate four independent bishops in Écône, Switzerland, in 1988. Nowadays there are in Campos two Roman Catholic jurisdictions: a Diocese, whose Bishop is Monsignor Roberto Gomes Guimarães and the Personal Apostolic Administration of Saint John Mary Vianney, whose Apostolic Administrator is Monsignor Fernando Areas Rifan.

Geography

Location

Campos dos Goytacazes has an area of 4,032 km2 (1,557 sq mi), which makes it the largest municipality in the state by area, and its elevation is 14 m. Its name comes from the geographical characteristic of the region, very flat with fields (campos in Portuguese) and from the Goytacazes Indians, which inhabited the region. Campos, as the city is usually known, is a macro region of the Northern Fluminense, and is a micro region of Campos dos Goytacazes. The city has a tropical climate.

The municipality contains part of the  Desengano State Park, created in 1970.

BR-101 is the access highway of the city of Campos. Regular air services are operated from its airport Bartolomeu Lysandro. It is the easternmost municipality in Rio de Janeiro.

Climate
Records equal or superior to  include: 
  on 2 November 1977, 
  on 18 November 2008, 
  on 14 November 2016, 
  on 20 November 1972, 
  on 24 November de 1966, 
  on 6 March 1960, 
  on 27 November 1992, 
  on 11 November 1970, 
  on 12 December 2005, 
  on 23 February 1933, 
  on 28 November 2008 and 
  on 28 March 1966.

Economy
City's economy is based on oil extraction. The GDP for the city was R$17,283,381. (2016).

The per capita income for the city was R$35,475.  (2016).

Crime
Campos dos Goytacazes recorded 233 homicides in 2018 for a murder rate of 46 homicides per 100,000 people for the year. This makes Campos dos Goytacazes the most violent city in the southern half of Brazil.

Education

Educational institutions
 Universidade Estadual do Norte Fluminense;
 Universidade Cândido Mendes;
 Universidade Federal Rural do Rio de Janeiro;
 Faculdade de Medicina de Campos;
 Faculdade de Direito de Campos;
 Faculdade de Odontologia Campos;
 IF Fluminense (former CEFET Campos);
 Universidade Federal Fluminense;
 Universidade Salgado de Oliveira;
 Universidade Estácio de Sá;
 Faculdade Batista Fluminense;
 Ise-Censa;
 Unigranrio;

Demographics 

The population of Campos is 471,737, up from the 436,008 in 2000, but down from the 1990s, 1980s, 1970s, 1960s and 1950s. The city in the 1950s was the second largest of the state of Rio de Janeiro. The reasons behind these reductions are the "crash" that the economy of the town, based on oil, suffered in 1954, something similar that happened in Detroit with the auto industries. According to the 2010 census of IBGE (Brazilian institute of geography and statistics), whites represent 47.6% of population, brown or mulatos 36.8% and black of African 14.6%. Other races represent 1.0% of the population.

Sports
There are at least four football clubs in the city, namely Americano, Campos, Goytacaz and Rio Branco. The derby between Americano and Goytacaz is known as Goyta-cano.

References

External links
Campos Prefecture Official Website
Bishop Antônio de Castro Mayer

Populated coastal places in Rio de Janeiro (state)
Populated places established in 1677
1835 establishments in Brazil
Municipalities in Rio de Janeiro (state)